Blondie Goes to College is a 1942 American comedy film directed by Frank R. Strayer. The film is a part of the Blondie series, starring Penny Singleton in the title role. It is the tenth of twenty-eight Blondie movies starring Penny Singleton and Arthur Lake.

Plot
Dagwood Bumstead (Arthur Lake) is forced to receive a college diploma in order to remain a worker at the Dithers Construction Company. He goes to school with his wife Blondie (Penny Singleton), until they get the news that married couples are not allowed. They decide to pretend they aren't a couple. A dilemma starts when Laura Wadsworth (Janet Blair) begins to flirt with Dagwood, while Big Man on Campus Rusty Bryant (Larry Parks) does the same with Blondie. Even more problems come to Blondie when she discovers she is pregnant. Afraid to tell Dagwood out of fear of expulsion from class, she decides to keep it a secret.

Cast
 Penny Singleton as Blondie Bumstead, aka Blondie Smith
 Arthur Lake as Dagwood 'Daggie' Bumstead
 Janet Blair as Laura Wadsworth
 Larry Simms as Baby Dumpling Bumstead
 Jonathan Hale as J.C. Dithers
 Adele Mara as Babs Connelly
 Danny Mummert as Alvin Fuddle
 Larry Parks as Rusty Bryant
 Lloyd Bridges as Ben Dixon
 Andrew Tombes as J.J 'Snookie' Wadsworth
 Sid Melton as Mouse

References

External links
 
 
 
 

1942 films
American black-and-white films
1940s English-language films
Columbia Pictures films
1942 comedy films
Films directed by Frank R. Strayer
Films set in universities and colleges
Rowing films
Blondie (film series) films
1940s American films